Bradford Dillman (April 14, 1930 – January 16, 2018) was an American actor and author.

Early life
Bradford Dillman was born on April 14, 1930, in San Francisco, the son of Dean Dillman, a stockbroker, and Josephine (née Moore). Bradford's paternal grandparents were Charles Francis Dillman and Stella Borland Dean. He studied at Town School for Boys and St. Ignatius High School. He later attended the Hotchkiss School in Connecticut, where he became involved with school theatre productions. While at Yale University, he enlisted in the U.S. Naval Reserve in 1948. While a student, he was a member of the Yale Dramatic Association, Fence Club, Torch Honor Society, The Society of Orpheus and Bacchus, WYBC and Berzelius. He graduated from Yale in 1951 with a BA in English Literature.

After graduation, he entered the United States Marine Corps as an officer candidate, training at Parris Island. He was commissioned as a second lieutenant in the Marine Corps in September 1951. As he was preparing to deploy to the war in Korea, his orders were changed, and he spent the rest of his time in the Marine Corps, from 1951 to 1953, teaching communication in the Instructors' Orientation Course. He was discharged in 1953 with the rank of first lieutenant.

Career
Studying with the Actors Studio, Dillman spent several seasons apprenticing with the Sharon, Connecticut Playhouse before making his professional acting debut in The Scarecrow in 1953.

Broadway
Dillman first performed in a Broadway play as part of the U.S. premiere cast of Eugene O'Neill's Long Day's Journey into Night in November 1956.  He portrayed the author's alter-ego character Edmund Tyrone and won a Theatre World Award for his performance. The production also featured Fredric March, Florence Eldridge and Jason Robards Jr., and played for 390 performances until March 1958.

During 1955 he appeared in an episode of the television series The Big Picture as an MP patrolling the city of Augusta, Georgia. In 1957, Katharine Cornell cast him in a Hallmark Hall of Fame television production of Robert E. Sherwood's Pulitzer Prize winning 1940 play, There Shall Be No Night.

20th Century Fox
Dillman was cast in the movie melodrama A Certain Smile (1958). He followed this with In Love and War (1958), a war movie featuring many of 20th Century Fox's young contract players, for which he earned a Golden Globe award. It was a financial success. So too was Compulsion (1959), featuring Dillman, Dean Stockwell and Orson Welles for producer Richard Zanuck and director Richard Fleischer.

Dillman shared an award for Best Actor with Stockwell and Welles at the Cannes Film Festival. After making the movie A Circle of Deception (1960) in London, Dillman was reunited with Welles, Fleischer and Zanuck for Crack in the Mirror (1960), filmed in Paris. It was unsuccessful. Back in Hollywood, Fox cast Dillman in support of Yves Montand and Lee Remick in Sanctuary (1961). They also had him in the title role in Francis of Assisi (1961).

Television
When he quit Fox, Dillman mostly concentrated on television. He guest-starred in a 1963 episode of The Virginian, titled: "Echo of Another Day". He co-featured with Diana Hyland in the Alfred Hitchcock Hour episode "To Catch A Butterfly" in February 1963, and with Barbara Barrie in the 1964 Hitchcock Hour episode "Isabel". He appeared in seven episodes of Dr. Kildare (1964–66) and 26 of Court Martial (1965–66). He guest-featured in television series such as The F.B.I. (six episodes), Ironside (two episodes), Shane, The Name of the Game, Columbo, Wild Wild West, The Eleventh Hour, Wagon Train, The Greatest Show on Earth, Breaking Point, Mission Impossible (two episodes), The Mary Tyler Moore Show, Cannon, Barnaby Jones (six episodes), Three for the Road, Wonder Woman and a two-part episode of The Man From U.N.C.L.E., which was made into the feature movie The Helicopter Spies (1968).

Dillman appeared twice in the Western television series The Big Valley (1965–69), once in season two, episode 15, titled "Day of the Comet", broadcast December 26, 1966; and the second time in season three, episode 9, titled "A Noose is Waiting", which was broadcast November 13, 1967. He appeared in occasional movies during this period, including A Rage to Live (1965), Sergeant Ryker (1968), and The Bridge at Remagen (1969).

Dillman played painter Richard Pickman in the television adaptation of H.P. Lovecraft's 1926 story, Pickman's Model, presented as the opening act of a December 1971 Night Gallery episode. He starred as Tony Goodland in "the Greenhouse Jungle", the second episode of the second season of Columbo (initially aired on October 15, 1972).

Later career and author
Dillman appeared in made-for-television movies such as Fear No Evil (1969), Moon of the Wolf (1972), and Deliver Us from Evil (1973). His film work included Escape from the Planet of the Apes (1971), The Way We Were (1973), Gold (1974), Bug (1975), The Enforcer (1976), The Swarm (1978), Piranha (1978), Sudden Impact (1983), and Lords of the Deep (1989). He appeared in 10 episodes of Falcon Crest (1982–83), and 2 of Dynasty (1984). His last known acting appearance was an episode of Murder, She Wrote in 1995, his eighth guest appearance on the series.

Dillman's football fan book, Inside The New York Giants, was published in 1995. An autobiography, Are You Anybody?: An Actor's Life, was published in 1997.

Personal life

From 1956 to 1962, Dillman was married to Frieda Harding and had two children (Jeffrey and Pamela) with her. He met actress and model Suzy Parker during the production of A Circle of Deception (1960). The couple married on April 20, 1963 and had three children, Dinah, Charles, and Christopher. The marriage lasted until Parker's death on May 3, 2003. 

Dillman was a cousin of the eccentric author and heiress Aimee Crocker.

Dillman lived for many years in Montecito, California, and helped raise money for medical research. He died in Santa Barbara, California on January 16, 2018, aged 87, due to complications of pneumonia.

Bradford Dillman was the actor's real name.  He said "Bradford Dillman sounded like a distinguished, phony, theatrical name -- so I kept it."

Selected filmography

 A Certain Smile (1958) as Bertrand Griot
 In Love and War (1958) as Alan Newcombe
 Compulsion (1959) as Arthur A. Straus
 Crack in the Mirror (1960) as Larnier / Claude
 A Circle of Deception (1960) as Capt. Paul Raine
 Sanctuary (1961) as Gowan Stevens
 Francis of Assisi (1961) as Francis Bernardone of Assisi
 Monstrosity (1963) as Narrator (voice, uncredited)
 Alfred Hitchcock Presents (1963) as Bill Nelson, in episode "To Catch a Butterfly"
 A Rage to Live (1965) as Sidney Tate
 The Plainsman (1966) as Lt. Stiles
 The Helicopter Spies (1968) as Luther Sebastian (archive footage)
 Sergeant Ryker (1968) as Capt. David Young (archive footage)
 Jigsaw (1968) as Jonathan Fields
 Fear No Evil (1969, TV Movie) as Paul Varney
 The Bridge at Remagen (1969) as Major Barnes
 Mastermind (1969) as Jabez Link
 Black Water Gold (1970, TV Movie) as Lyle Fawcett
 Suppose They Gave a War and Nobody Came? (1970) as Capt. Myerson
 Brother John (1971) as Lloyd Thomas
 The Mephisto Waltz (1971) as Bill Delancey
 Escape from the Planet of the Apes (1971) as Dr. Lewis Dixon
 Five Desperate Women (1971, TV Movie) as Jim Meeker
 The Resurrection of Zachary Wheeler (1971) as Sen. Clayton Zachary Wheeler
 Moon of the Wolf (1972, TV movie) as Andrew Rodanthe
 Mission Impossible (1972, TV series) as Larry Edison
 Deliver Us from Evil (1973, TV Movie) as Steven Dennis
 The Way We Were (1973) as J.J.
 The Iceman Cometh (1973) as Willie Oban
 Chosen Survivors (1974) as Peter Macomber
 99 and 44/100% Dead (1974) as Big Eddie
 Gold (1974) as Manfred Steyner
 A Black Ribbon for Deborah (1974) as Michel Lagrange
 The Disappearance of Flight 412 (1974, TV Movie) as Maj. Mike Dunning
 Bug (1975) as James Parmiter
 Mastermind (1976) as Jabez Link
 The Enforcer (1976) as Capt. Jerome McKay
 One Away (1976) as Ruben Bass
 The Hostage Heart (1977, TV movie) as Dr. Eric Lake
 The Amsterdam Kill (1977) as Howard Odums
 The Lincoln Conspiracy (1977) as John Wilkes Booth
 The Swarm (1978) as Major Baker
 Piranha (1978) as Paul Grogan
 Love and Bullets (1979) as Jim Brickman
 Guyana: Crime of the Century (1979) as Dr. Gary Shaw
 The Memory of Eva Ryker (1980, TV Movie) as Jason Eddington
 Running Scared (1980) as Arthur Jaeger
 The Legend of Walks Far Woman (1982, TV Movie) as Singer
 Sudden Impact (1983) as Captain Briggs
 Treasure of the Amazon (1985) as Clark
 Man Outside (1987) as Frank Simmons
 Lords of the Deep (1989) as Dobler
 Heroes Stand Alone (1989) as Walt Simmons

References

External links
 
 Cinema Retro's interview with Bradford Dillman
 
 
 Bradford Dillman(Aveleyman)

1930 births
2018 deaths
20th Century Studios contract players
American male film actors
American male stage actors
American male television actors
Burials at Santa Barbara Cemetery
Cannes Film Festival Award for Best Actor winners
Deaths from pneumonia in California
Hotchkiss School alumni
Male actors from San Francisco
Military personnel from California
New Star of the Year (Actor) Golden Globe winners
People from Montecito, California
Theatre World Award winners
United States Marine Corps officers
United States Marine Corps personnel of the Korean War
Yale College alumni